Songs III: Bird on the Water is Marissa Nadler's third full-length studio album, released in March 2007 on Peacefrog Records. It was distributed in the US and Canada in August 2007 by New York City-based Kemado Records.

Reception
The album was nominated for Best Americana Record of the Year at the 2007 PLUG Awards; Nadler was also nominated as Best Female Artist. After the album, Nadler also won "Outstanding Singer-Songwriter of the Year" at the 2008 Boston Music Awards, with three nominations altogether.

Track listing
 "Diamond Heart" – 3:47
 "Dying Breed" – 3:38
 "Mexican Summer" - 5:27
 "Thinking of You" - 3:36
 "Silvia" - 5:40
 "Bird on Your Grave" - 5:02
 "Rachel" - 4:20
 "Feathers" - 3:59
 "Famous Blue Raincoat" - 4:23
 "My Love and I" - 3:32
 "Leather Made Shoes" - 4:42

The US release of this album included a digital bonus EP with the following tracks:
 "Conjuring Spirit Worlds" - 5:00
 "Daisy & Violet" - 3:41
 "Honey Bear" - 3:25
 "Cortez the Killer" - 3:57

Singles
 "Diamond Heart"/"Leather Made Shoes" (May 2006)
 "Diamond Heart"/"Dying Breed" (February 2007)
 "Bird on Your Grave" (music video only) (October 2007)

Credits

Album
 Marissa Nadler - vocals, guitar, background vocals
 Greg Weeks - synthesiser, acid leads, vocals
 Helena Espvall - cello
 Orion Rigel Dommisse - synthesiser
 Jesse Sparhawk - mandolin, harp
 Otto Hauser - percussion

All songs written by Marissa Nadler, except:
"Famous Blue Raincoat," written by Leonard Cohen.
"Cortez the Killer," written by Neil Young.

Production
 Recorded by Greg Weeks at Hexham Head Studio, Philadelphia, PA.
 Produced by Greg Weeks and Marissa Nadler
 Mastered by Mandy Parnell at Electric Mastering, London
 Design by Studio Special Design. Inside photograph by Socrates Mitsios.

References

External links
Marissa Nadler Official Site

2007 albums
Marissa Nadler albums
Peacefrog Records albums